The Turin–Lyon high-speed railway is an international rail line under construction between the cities of Turin and Lyon.
The core of the project is its international section, which will cross the Alps through the Mont d'Ambin Base Tunnel between the Susa Valley in Piedmont and Maurienne in Savoie. 
At , that tunnel will be the longest rail tunnel in the world, ahead of the  Gotthard Base Tunnel. The estimated total cost of the line is €25 billion, of which €8 billion is for the international section, which is the only part of the line where work has started.

Like the Swiss NRLA project, the line has twin aims of transferring freight traffic across the Alps from trucks to rail to reduce air pollution and CO2 emissions and of providing faster passenger transport to reduce air traffic. The line is therefore part instead of the TEN-T Trans-European conventional rail network within its "Mediterranean Corridor"—previously "Corridor 6". The European Union funds 40% of the tunnel costs, and has indicated its willingness to increase its contribution to 55%, as well as to help fund its French accesses if those go beyond mere adaptations of the existing infrastructure.

The project has been criticized for its cost, because traffic (both by motorway and by rail) was decreasing when the project was decided, for potential environmental risks during the construction of the tunnel, and because airplanes will still, after including time to and from the airport and through security, be slightly faster over the full Milan–Paris route. A 2012 report by the French Court of Audit questioned the realism of the costs estimates and traffic forecasts. 
Opposition to the project is mostly organised under the loose banner of the No TAV movement.

Civil engineering work started in 2002 with the construction of access points and geological reconnaissance tunneling. 
A  gallery tunneled between 2016 and 2019 from Saint-Martin-de-la-Porte towards Italy was presented as reconnaissance work, but it was dug at the position of the south tube of the tunnel and at its final diameter, and it effectively represents the first 8% of the final tunnel length.  As of 2021, the expected completion date for the base tunnel is 2032.

Pre-construction studies
The worthiness of the new line was the subject of heated debate, primarily in Italy. After a 2005 attempt to start reconnaissance work near Susa resulted in violent confrontations between opponents and police, an Italian governmental commission was set up in 2006 to study all the issues.
The work of the commission between 2007 and 2009 was summarized into seven papers (Quaderni). An eighth summary paper focused on cost–benefit analysis was unveiled in June 2012.

Test drilling found some fractured and sheared coal-bearing schists close to the French portal that are poorly suited for a tunnel boring machine, and old-fashion drilling and blasting is used for the corresponding  section.

The present high-altitude line
Since 1872, the Turin–Modane railway connects Turin with Lyon via the -long high-altitude (maximum tunnel altitude ) Fréjus Rail Tunnel. This initially single-track line was doubled and electrified in the early 20th century, and the Italian side of the line was renovated between 1962 and 1984, and again between 2001 and 2011.
This historical line has a low maximum allowed height, and its sharp curves force low speeds. Its very poor profile, with a maximum gradient of 30‰, requires doubling or tripling the locomotives of freight trains.

The characteristics of the line vary widely along its length. The Osservatorio (see References) divides the international and Italian sides into four sections:
 Modane–Bussoleno (Frejus tunnel and high valley section)
 Bussoleno–Avigliana (low valley section)
 Avigliana–Turin (metropolitan section)
 Turin node (urban section)
The first section comprises the Fréjus tunnel. Its low tunnel ceilings, high elevation, sharp curves, and steep gradients, make this section the limiting factor on the overall capacity of the line. A 2007 study used the CAPRES model to calculate a maximum capacity of 226 trains/day, 350 days/year, under the safety regulations applicable at the time. The study foresaw a maximum traffic of 180 freight trains per day, which had to be lowered to about 150 freight trains per day due to logistical inefficiency (the traffic flows between the two countries are asymmetric). A similar analysis for the full year led to a total of about 260 peak days per year. These conditions defined a maximum transport capacity per year of about 20 million tonnes when accounting for inefficiencies, and an absolute limit of about 32 million in "perfect" conditions.
Additional traffic limitations stem from the impact of excessive train transit on the population living near the line. Some 60,000 people live within  of the historical line, and would object to the noise from late-night transits.
In 2007 the conventional line was used for only one-third of this calculated total capacity. This low use level was in part because restrictions such as an unusually low maximum allowable train height and the very steep gradients (26–30‰) and sharp curves in its high valley sections discourage its use.

A 2018 analysis, by contrast, found the line close to saturation, largely because updated safety regulations now prohibit a passenger and a freight train from crossing in a single-tube tunnel, which very significantly reduces the maximum allowed capacity of the Fréjus tunnel.

Traffic predictions on Frejus and Mont-Blanc corridors

The following table summarizes 2007 predictions of the future freight traffic on both the Frejus and Mont-Blanc corridors from an analysis of current data and macroeconomic predictions (in million tons per year):

Promoters of the new line predict that it will about double rail traffic on the Modane corridor compared to the reference scenario (see table above). Traffic predictions of even the early traffic of major rail infrastructures are however intrinsically uncertain, with well-known examples of both overestimates (e.g. the Channel tunnel) and underestimates (e.g. the TGV Est).
Anyway, some experts disagree with the necessity for a new line connecting France and Italy on the Modane corridor, quoting wide margins for increase in traffic on the old line.  Rather than as a natural consequence of faster transit times and a lower price for freight shipping (due to reduced energy use thanks to a much flatter profile, but without necessarily taking into account the full construction cost of the new line), they propose to increase rail traffic by coupling additional renovation of the existing rail infrastructure with sufficiently high financial incentives for rail transport and/or sufficiently heavy tolls and taxes on road transport. The political realism of such taxes is however questionable, as France demonstrated  in 2013 when its government withdrew a much smaller trucking ecotax after the trucking industry initiated extensive riots (see Bonnets Rouges). A 2018 study made this specific controversy much less relevant, by finding that the existing line actually is close to saturation, primarily because updated safety regulations on train crossings in single-tube tunnels have significantly reduced its maximum allowed capacity. The construction of a brand-new line will also allow higher safety standards, and it will make the older infrastructure fully available for regional and suburban services, which is an important consideration near the congested Turin node.

The new line

The construction of the full higher-speed line will cut passenger travel time from Milan to Paris from seven hours to four, becoming time-competitive with plane travel for town-center to town-center travel.

The line is divided into three sections constructed under separate managements: 
 the French section between Saint-Jean-de-Maurienne and the outskirts of Lyon will be built under SNCF Réseau management;
 the Italian section between Bussoleno (Susa valley) and Torino is under RFI;
 the international section between Saint-Jean-de-Maurienne in Savoie and Bussoleno includes the Mont d'Ambin Base Tunnel. It is managed by Tunnel Euralpin Lyon Turin (TELT SAS), a joint venture of RFI and SNCF which replaced Lyon Turin Ferroviaire.

French Section 
The French section of the new line is planned with eventually separate paths for passengers and freight between Lyon 
and the Maurienne valley.

The passenger line will link the  LGV Sud-Est (through a connection South of Gare de Lyon Saint-Exupéry) and the central Lyon stations to both Italy and Chambéry. It will connect near Chambéry to the Annecy via Aix les Bains and the Bourg Saint-Maurice via Albertville lines. The time gain from Paris or Lyon to Aix-les-Bains or Chambéry will be almost 45 minutes, and almost an hour to Annecy. The line may also be used to offload the saturated Lyon–Grenoble line from its TGV traffic, removing traffic at mismatched speeds and therefore freeing many much needed train paths for additional local trains.

The freight line will start from a connection to the future Lyon rail freight bypass, follow the A43 Motorway, and will pass South of Chambéry through a tunnel under the Chartreuse Mountains. The line will then reach Saint-Jean-de-Maurienne through a second  tunnel under the Belledonne mountains. The separate freight line will divert the freight traffic away from Aix-les-Bains and Chambéry, and from the shores of the Lac du Bourget where a freight accident on the existing line could catastrophically pollute this large natural freshwater reservoir.

Italian Section 
The path of the Italian section was adopted in August 2011 by the Italian government, after extensive 2006–2011 consultations headed by Government Commissary Mario Virano within the "Italian Technical Observatory". In the Susa valley the new path sidesteps through additional tunneling the strong opposition to a previous planned path on the left bank of the Dora Riparia, which would have needed a viaduct in Venaus and a tunnel in Bussoleno.

International Section 

The  Mont d'Ambin base tunnel is being dug under the Mont d'Ambin and is the major engineering work of the overall future Turin–Lyon line. An underground service and rescue train station is planned around the half-way point of the tunnel, East of Modane.

Construction progress 

Civil engineering work started in 2002 with the construction of access points and geological reconnaissance tunneling. Construction of the tunnel itself was at that time planned to start in 2014–2015, but the project was only approved in 2015 for a cost of €25 billion, of which €8 billion is for the base tunnel. The ratification of the corresponding international treaty by the parliaments of the two countries concluded with a 26 January 2017 vote of the French Senate.
Starting in 2016 and therefore before the ratification of the treaty, a  gallery was tunneled from Saint-Martin-de-la-Porte towards Italy. While presented as a reconnaissance gallery, it was dug along the axis of the South tube of the tunnel and at its final diameter. In late-2016, that tunnel encountered a geologically difficult zone of water-soaked fractured coal-bearing schists, and for several months made only very slow progress through it. Tunneling passed this zone in Spring 2017 after injecting 30 tons of reinforcing resin, and resumed at nominal speed. That gallery was completed in September 2019, in time and within budget, 
and it makes up the first  of the South tube of the tunnel.

The contracting for the bulk of the tunnel construction was then delayed by deep disagreements on the merits of the Turin–Lyon project within the Italian coalition government between the Five Star Movement and Lega parties, and in March 2019, Italy's Prime Minister Giuseppe Conte officially asked TELT to stop the launch of tenders for further construction work. A few months later, and just before further delays would have threatened the EU funding of the project, the Italian government eventually agreed to the publication of calls for tender for the main tunneling work on the French and Italian sides. 2.8 billion euros of construction contracts had been signed as of June 2020, and contracts worth a further 3 billion euros  for the excavation of the 80% of the tunnel located on the French side of the border were attributed in July 2021 and signed in September 2021. Those contracts  are:  

Drilling and blasting for the  Lot 3 section started from the French portal on December 8th 2022. On-going work at the other French work sites prepares for the 2024 arrival of the 5 tunnel boring machines, which have been ordered. As of late-2022, the expected completion date for the base tunnel was 2032.

Opposition to the project

Ever since plans for the railway line were first mentioned in the 1990s, some residents of most of the 112 towns and villages along its path have been set strongly against it.
No TAV is an Italian movement against the construction of the line named from the Italian TAV acronym for Treno Alta Velocità, high speed train. French opposition to the railway also exists but has been less visible. A 2019 poll  in both countries, commissioned by TELT but conducted by respected polling companies, found that opposition to the railway link increases as one approaches the location of the tunnel, but that it is nonetheless a minority view even in the Susa and Maurienne valleys.

Local French views
In Chimilin, a French town of 1,100 which will be split by the railway, the town council has opposed the plans since 1992 and the 2014-2020 mayor, Marie Chabert, saw the economic uncertainty as damaging for the region.

In Villarodin-Bourget, a small French village, residents represented by the 'Association pour la Sauvegarde du Site du Moulin' have opposed the digging of a  survey tunnel since 2002 and are in close communication with the No TAV movement. The mayor, Gilles Margueron, said "after we started looking at the project in details, we soon arrived at a position of complete opposition."

No TAV movement in Italy

Some people in the Susa Valley in Italy have been resisting the railway project since the 1990s. The No TAV movement began in 1990, with actions to inform local people affected by the plans, supported by the mayors of the valley and the Comunità Montana (mountainous community). From 2000 onwards, there were demonstrations, squatted centres, a trade union solidarity project and a social forum. The resistance was spoken about in terms of the partisan resistance to the Nazis in World War II.

The movement advocates the tactics of non-violent direct action, but some protests have turned violent. Catholics pray at the Chiomonte construction site, while other networks organise communal dinners, discussions and flash mobs. In Venaus, a land squat called the 'Presidio' is situated next to where the survey tunnel was originally planned to be dug.

Arguments 
The No TAV movement generally questions the worthiness, cost, and safety of the project, drawing arguments from studies, experts, and governmental documents from Italy, France, and Switzerland. It deems the new line useless and too expensive, and decries its realization as driven by construction lobbies. Its main stated objections are:
Better to update existing infrastructure.
Low level of saturation on the Frejus rail tunnel and stable or decreasing traffic also on Fréjus Road Tunnel. A more recent study, though, found the existing rail line close to saturation because toughened safety standards on train crossings in single-tube tunnels have sharply reduced its capacity.
Economical feasibility in doubt due to high costs.
Danger of environmental disasters.
Health concerns, due to the hypothesized presence of uranium and asbestos in and around the mountains where the tunnel is bored, though the extensive reconnaissance tunneling has found none to date. Supporters of the tunnel argue that the risk of contamination is overstated or non-existent.

Members of the protest movement have summarized their ideas against the construction of the new line in a document containing 150 reasons against it and in a wide number of specific documents and meetings.

Critics of the No TAV movement, by contrast, characterize it as a typical NIMBY (Not In My Back Yard) movement and point out the pollution reduction and CO2 emission elimination benefits of the tunnel. In response, No TAV activists talk about LULU (Locally unwanted land use).

See also

Mediterranean Corridor
Mont d'Ambin Base Tunnel
Lyon Turin Ferroviaire
High-speed rail in Europe
List of longest tunnels
List of tunnels by location
Treno Alta Velocità
TGV
Rete Ferroviaria Italiana
Réseau Ferré de France

Notes

References
 Quaderno 1: Linea storica – Tratta di valico [Book 1: Old line – upper section]. Osservatorio Ministeriale per il collegamento ferroviario Torino-Lione, Rome, May 2007
 Quaderno 2: Scenari di traffico – Arco Alpino [Book 2: Traffic scenarios – Alps passes]. Osservatorio Ministeriale per il collegamento ferroviario Torino-Lione, Rome, June 2007
 Quaderno 3: Linea storica – Tratta di valle [Book 3: Old line – lower section]. Osservatorio Ministeriale per il collegamento ferroviario Torino-Lione, Rome, December 2007

External links
RFI – Rete Ferroviaria Italiana – owner of the Italian rail infrastructure
RFF – Réseau Ferré de France – owner of the French rail infrastructure
TELT Lyon–Turin – The company responsible for the Turin–Lyon line, owned 50% by RFI and 50% by RFF.
No TAV documents against the project in English
 TAV Turin–Lyon planned line in Google Earth/Maps

Railway lines in Piedmont
High-speed railway lines in Italy
High-speed railway lines in France
Proposed railway lines in France
Proposed railway lines in Italy
2029 in rail transport